there were 878 districts (amphoe) in Thailand. This table lists those districts, and the provinces (changwat) of Thailand and regions (phak) of Thailand in which they lie.

This sortable table does not include districts in Bangkok. See List of districts of Bangkok.

At the bottom follows a table with Thai names of the large regions.

Nomenclature: regions

See also

Administrative divisions of Thailand
List of districts of Bangkok
List of tambon in Thailand
Provinces of Thailand
List of cities in Thailand

References

Districts
 List of